Márcio Salomão Brazão Rosa (born 23 February 1997) is a Cape Verdean footballer who plays as a goalkeeper for the Portuguese club Montalegre.

Professional career
Rosa began playing football at the age of 8 with Escola de Preparação Integral de Futebol in Cape Verde. He moved to the Portuguese club Chaves in 2015, and after a year in the youth academy joined Montalegre on loan in 2016.

International career
Rosa was called up to represent the Cape Verde national team in May 2018 for two international friendlies. He made his debut in a 0-0 (4-3) penalty shootout win over Andorra on 3 June 2018.
He was named in the roster for the 2021 Africa cup of nations  2021 when the team reached the round of 16..

References

External links
 
 

1997 births
Living people
Sportspeople from Praia
Cape Verdean footballers
Cape Verde international footballers
Liga Portugal 2 players
Campeonato de Portugal (league) players
G.D. Chaves players
C.D.C. Montalegre players
C.D. Cova da Piedade players
Association football goalkeepers
Cape Verdean expatriate footballers
Cape Verdean expatriate sportspeople in Portugal
Expatriate footballers in Portugal
2021 Africa Cup of Nations players